Çelik Erişçi (born 12 May 1966), better known by his stage name Çelik, is a Turkish singer-songwriter. Since the early 1990s, with the successful sales of his albums, he has been a prominent figure of pop music, recognized in Turkey.

Discography
Source:

Albums
 1991: Özledim (İzel-Çelik-Ercan)
 1994: Ateşteyim
 1995: Benimle Kal
 1996: Yaman Sevda
 1997: Sevdan Gözümün Bebeği
 1998: Sevgilerimle
 1999: Onu Düşünürken
 2000: Unutamam
 2001: 8inci
 2002: Yol
 2003: Affet
 2005: Gariban
 2006: Kod Adı Aşk
 2012: Milat

Compilation Albums
 2013: Selam Söyle
 2013: Best of
 2022: Hediye

EPs
 2011: Kalp Gözü
 2017: İyi Günde, Kötü Günde
 2019: Üstü Açık Araba

Singles

References

External links
 Offizielle Official website
 
 

Çelik Erişçi
People from Istanbul
Çelik Erişçi
Turkish pop singers
20th-century Turkish male singers
21st-century Turkish male singers
Turkish singer-songwriters